The California State Assembly Republican Caucus is the formal organization of Republican Members in the California State Assembly, who hold 18 of its 80 seats after the 2022 general election. It is one of the Assembly’s two officially recognized political party caucuses and is led by Assembly Member James Gallagher, the Assembly Republican Leader (Minority Leader of the State Assembly).

Current Caucus Members for the 2020-2022 term (Hometown or Region in Parentheses) 
 Frank Bigelow, 5th District (O'Neals)
 Laurie Davies, 73rd District (Laguna Niguel)
 Phillip Chen, 55th District (Yorba Linda)
 Steven Choi, 68th District (Irvine)
 Jordan Cunningham, 35th District (Templeton)
 Megan Dahle, 1st District (Bieber)
 Heath Flora, 12th District (Ripon)
 Vince Fong, 34th District (Bakersfield)
 James Gallagher, 3rd District (East Nicolaus)
 Kevin Kiley, 6th District (Rocklin)
 Tom Lackey, 36th District (Palmdale)
 Devon Mathis, 26th District (Tulare)
 Janet Nguyen, 72nd District (Fountain Valley)
 Jim Patterson, 23rd District (Fresno)
 Kelly Seyarto, 67th District (Murrieta)
 Thurston Smith, 33rd District (Apple Valley)
 Suzette Martinez Valladares, 38th District (Santa Clarita)
 Randy Voepel, 71st District (El Cajon) 
 Marie Waldron, 75th District (Escondido)

Caucus Leadership Positions 
Assembly Republican Leader – James Gallagher
The Republican Leader serves multiple roles. Aside from serving as the elected representative of his or her district, the Leader serves as the primary spokesperson of the Assembly Republican membership. The Leader oversees caucus operations and develops policies to implement Republican legislative priorities, and helps elect more Republicans to office.

Assembly Republican Leaders since 1959
 Joseph C. Shell 1959-63
 Charles J. Conrad 1963-64
 Robert T. Monagan 1965-69 (Served as Speaker from 1969–70)
 Robert G. Beverly 1972-75
 Paul V. Priolo 1976-79
 Carol Hallett 1979-82
 Robert W. Naylor 1982-84
 Pat Nolan 1984-88
 Ross Johnson 1988-91
 Bill Jones 1991-92
 James Brulte 1992-95
 Curt Pringle 1995-97 (Served as Speaker in 1996)
 Bill Leonard 1997-98
 Rod Pacheco 1998-99
 Scott Baugh 1999-2000
 Bill Campbell 2000-01
 Dave Cox 2001-04
 Kevin McCarthy 2004-06
 George Plescia 2006
 Mike Villines 2006-09
 Sam Blakeslee 2009-10
 Martin Garrick 2010
 Connie Conway 2010–2014
 Kristin Olsen 2014-2016
 Chad Mayes 2016-2017
 Brian Dahle 2017-2018
 Marie Waldron 2018–2022
 James Gallagher (2022-Present)

Republican Floor Leader - James Gallagher

Assistant Republican Floor Leader – Heath Flora, Phillip Chen and Chad Mayes
The Assistant Republican Floor Leader is the lead Republican helping to ensure the smooth operation of the business of the Legislature during Assembly session, and that common-sense measures receive full and fair consideration during legislative debate. Interacting directly with the Majority Floor Leader concerning floor session proceedings, the Assistant Republican Floor Leader plays a key role in helping guide debate on the Assembly Floor for the Republican Caucus.

Assembly Republican Caucus Chair – Tom Lackey
The Republican Caucus Chair assists the Leader in advancing the Republican policy agenda and achieving the Caucus’ political goals. Additionally, the Caucus Chair regularly communicates with Republican leaders throughout California on key legislative issues and party matters.

Deputy Republican Floor Leader – Rocky Chavez and Frank Bigelow
The Deputy Republican Floor Leader works closely with the Assistant Republican Floor Leader helping to ensure the smooth operation of the business of the Legislature during Assembly session, and that common-sense measures receive full and fair consideration during legislative debate.

Assembly Rules Committee Vice Chair – Jordan Cunningham
The Vice Chair of the Assembly Rules Committee plays an important role in ensuring that legislation receives a full and fair hearing in the Assembly. The Assembly Rules Committee acts as the executive committee of the lower house. One of its most important functions is to refer all bills and resolutions to the appropriate Standing Committee. It also grants rule waivers or suspensions and handles all personnel matters.

Assembly Budget Committee Vice Chair – Jay Obernolte
The Vice Chair of the Assembly Budget Committee plays an integral role in the drafting of the State Budget each year, serving as chief budget advocate and spokesperson for Assembly Republicans, working to advance fiscally-conservative principles throughout the budget process.

Assembly Appropriations Committee Vice Chair – Frank Bigelow
The Vice Chair of the Assembly Appropriations Committee is on the front lines of the debate over government spending at the State Capitol. The committee analyzes every fiscal bill making its way through the Legislature for its impact on the state budget and state spending overall, working to restrain new government spending and overregulation.

Chief Republican Whip – Heath Flora
The Chief Republican Whip helps devise legislative floor strategy and provide direction and guidance to the Republican Whips as they work to advance the Republican caucus position during Assembly floor sessions.

Republican Whips – James Gallagher and Vince Fong
Republican Whips are charged with mobilizing members vote on important legislation, acting as a liaison between members and leadership, and helping to coordinate strategy within the caucus.

References

External links 
 California State Assembly Republican Caucus (official site)

See also 
 California Republican Party

California State Legislature